Ellen Lewin is an American author, anthropologist, and academic.  Lewin, a lesbian, focuses her work on areas of motherhood, sexuality, and reproduction. She received the Ruth Benedict Prize in 1992 for her monograph, Lesbian Mothers: Accounts of Gender in American Culture.. Lewin is a professor of anthropology at the University of Iowa.

Biography 
Ellen Lewin received her A.B. (Bachelors of Arts) in 1967 for linguistics from the College of the University of Chicago. She went on to obtain her AM (Masters of Arts) in Anthropology in 1968 and later her Ph.D. in Anthropology in 1975 at Stanford University. She concluded her studies at Stanford University with one of her earlier works, Mothers and Children: Latin American Immigrants in San Francisco.

Lewin conducted research on Latin American women in San Francisco for her dissertation. She also completed another study comparing aspects of motherhood among lesbians and heterosexual single women. Her research has focused on gender, sexuality, identity, reproduction, medical anthropology and lesbian/gay anthropology.

Awards
Lewin was recipient of the Ruth Benedict Prize in 1992 for her monograph, Lesbian Mothers: Accounts of Gender in American Culture..: 3

Notable works 
 Lesbian Mothers: Accounts of Gender in American Culture (Cornell University Press, 1993)
 Recognizing Ourselves: Lesbian and Gay Ceremonies of Commitment (Columbia University Press, 1998)
 Editor of Inventing Lesbian Cultures in America (Beacon Press, 1996) and Feminist Anthropology: A Reader (Blackwell, 2006)
 Co-editor of Out in the Field: Reflections of Lesbian and Gay Anthropologists (University of Illinois Press, 1996), Out in Theory: The Emergence of Lesbian and Gay Anthropology (University of Illinois Press, 2002), and Reinventing Lesbian/Gay Anthropology in a Globalizing World with William Leap.

References 

1946 births
Living people
American women anthropologists
LGBT anthropologists
Lesbian academics
American women writers
Stanford University alumni
University of Chicago alumni
University of Iowa faculty
American women academics
21st-century American women